Doron plate is a strong fiberglass-based laminate that was first used by the United States Marines as personal body armor for infantry in the Battle of Okinawa in 1945. The plates consist of fiberglass filaments bonded together with resin under pressure. The plates could be molded to fit the contours of the chest or back. Dow Company discovered the technology for the doron plate in May 1943 because a shortage of metal during World War II had stimulated research into non-metallic forms of body armor. The doron plate could not stop direct fire from rifle and machine gun bullets, but was effective at stopping relatively slow moving flak, shrapnel and up to .45 acp pistol bullets fired at moderate distance. The plates were named after General G. F. Doriot who was chief of the Research and Development Branch, Office of the Quartermaster General of the Army during World War II. The doron plates were used in the Korean War in the M-1951 and T-52-2 vests and the Vietnam War in the M-1955 vests. Stronger and lighter materials such as Nylon- and later Kevlar-based body armor eventually superseded the doron plate.

References

Body armor